Vipre is a brand name for at least two software products. 
 VIPRE, an antivirus software product
 Vipre, a voice stress analysis product